Jesse David Edwards (born 18 March 2000) is a Dutch college basketball player for the Syracuse Orange of the Atlantic Coast Conference (ACC). Born in Amsterdam, Edwards is nicknamed "The Mad Professor" at Syracuse. He also plays for the Netherlands men's national basketball team.

Early life and high school career
Born in Amsterdam, Edwards started playing basketball at age 12 after first trying out several other sports. Two years later, he started playing with the youth section of Apollo Amsterdam. After graduating high school in the Netherlands, he went on to play for IMG Academy, a boarding school in Bradenton, Florida.

Recruiting
Edwards received offers by Georgia Tech and Providence, among others. On 5 April 2019, he committed to playing college basketball for Syracuse.

College career
Edwards averaged 2.4 points and 1.7 rebounds per game as a freshman. As a sophomore, he averaged 1.9 points and 2.6 rebounds per game. On 5 December 2021, he recorded his first career double-double, after recording 11 points and 12 rebounds against Florida State. On 8 February 2022, Edwards broke his left wrist during a game against Boston College, ending his season. He averaged 12 points and 6.5 rebounds per game as a junior, shooting 69.5 percent. 
In the 22-23 season Edwards currently has an average of 14.1 points, 10.9 rebounds and 3 blocks per game, while shooting 63.4 percent.

National team career
In July 2021, Edwards joined the training camp of the Netherlands senior team for the first time, along with his brother Kai. He was selected for the qualification games of the 2023 FIBA Basketball World Cup. On July 2, 2022, Edwards made his debut in a 66–67 away loss against Iceland in which he had 6 points, 7 rebounds and 2 blocks in 10 minutes of playing time.

In August 2022, Edwards rejoined the national team to participate in international competitions which includes World Cup qualifying and the Eurobasket. He was on the 12-man roster for EuroBasket 2022.

Career statistics

College

|-
| style="text-align:left;"| 2019–20
| style="text-align:left;"| Syracuse
| 21 || 0 || 6.9 || .792 || – || .632 || 1.7 || .0 || .2 || .5 || 2.4
|-
| style="text-align:left;"| 2020–21
| style="text-align:left;"| Syracuse
| 18 || 0 || 8.9 || .462 || – || .714 || 2.6 || .0 || .3 || .4 || 1.9
|- class="sortbottom"
| style="text-align:center;" colspan="2"| Career
| 39 || 0 || 7.8 || .620 || – || .667 || 2.1 || .0 || .3 || .5 || 2.2

Personal life
His older brother Kai also plays basketball, currently plays for AB Castelló and played college basketball for Northern Colorado from 2016 to 2020.

References

External links
Syracuse Orange bio

2000 births
Living people
Centers (basketball)
Dutch men's basketball players
IMG Academy alumni
Sportspeople from Amsterdam
Syracuse Orange men's basketball players